Peter Maher (born 16 March 1869, in Gunnode, Tuam, County Galway, Ireland – 22 July 1940 in Baltimore, Maryland) was an Irish boxer known for his powerful punch. Early in his career Maher won the 1888 Middleweight Championship of Ireland, and the 1890 Heavyweight Championship of Ireland. After moving to the United States he won the 1895 Heavyweight Championship of the World match by knocking out Steve O'Donnell in the first round. In 1896 Bob Fitzsimmons defeated Maher in a fight in Coahuila de Zaragoza, Mexico, and took the disputed heavyweight title.

Notable bouts

See also
List of bare-knuckle boxers

References

External links
Maher's Record at Cyber Boxing Zone

|-

1869 births
1940 deaths
Bare-knuckle boxers
Irish emigrants to the United States (before 1923)
Irish expatriates in the United States
Boxers from Baltimore
People from Tuam
Sportspeople from County Galway
19th-century Irish people
Irish male boxers
Heavyweight boxers